Luciano Andrés Abecasis (born 4 June 1990) is an Argentine professional footballer of Moroccan origin who plays for Banfield. 

Following the 2021 season, San Jose declined their contract option on Abecasis.

References

External links
Delfino Pescara profile

1990 births
Living people
Footballers from Rosario, Santa Fe
Argentine expatriate footballers
Argentine footballers
Association football defenders
Argentine people of Moroccan-Jewish descent
Argentine people of Portuguese descent
Club Atlético River Plate footballers
Quilmes Atlético Club footballers
Delfino Pescara 1936 players
Godoy Cruz Antonio Tomba footballers
Club Atlético Lanús footballers
Club Libertad footballers
San Jose Earthquakes players
Club Atlético Banfield footballers
Argentine Primera División players
Serie B players
Major League Soccer players
Expatriate footballers in Italy
Expatriate footballers in Paraguay
Expatriate soccer players in the United States
Argentine expatriate sportspeople in Italy
Argentine expatriate sportspeople in Paraguay
Argentine expatriate sportspeople in the United States